Guomao station (Cantonese Jyutping: Gwok3 Mau6 Zaam6), is a station on Line 1 of the Shenzhen Metro. It opened on 28 December 2004. It is located underneath the junction of Renmin South Road and Jiabin Road in Luohu District, Shenzhen, China. It is named after the Guomao Building (International Trade Centre Building). Along with the adjacent Laojie Station (where it is now used for cross-platform interchange), Guomao Station has an unusual layout with the two tracks situated above each other on two levels.

Station layout

Exits

References

External links
 Shenzhen Metro Guomao Station  (Chinese)
 Shenzhen Metro Guomao Station  (English)

Railway stations in Guangdong
Shenzhen Metro stations
Luohu District
Railway stations in China opened in 2004
Railway stations located underground in China